40 Skipper Street (Swedish: Skeppargatan 40) is a 1925 Swedish silent drama film directed by Gustaf Edgren and starring Einar Hanson, Mona Mårtenson and Magda Holm. It was shot at the Råsunda Studios in Stockholm. The film's sets were designed by the art director Vilhelm Bryde.

Cast
 Einar Hanson as 	Erhard Malm, tutor
 Mona Mårtenson as 	Ruth Frendin, a daughter
 Vilhelm Bryde as 	Lt. Gustaf Ek
 Magda Holm as Erika Blom
 Hulda Malmström as 	Mrs. Blom
 Edit Ernholm as 	Lovisa
 Gösta Alexandersson as 	Tom
 Albert Christiernsson as 	Tore Frendin, the Son
 Einar Fagstad as 	Seeman
 Ernst Fastbom as Tidlund
 Alfred Lundberg as 	Consul Frendin
 Henning Ohlsson as 	Andreas Persson
 Karin Swanström as Mrs. Frendin

References

Bibliography
 Qvist, Per Olov & von Bagh, Peter. Guide to the Cinema of Sweden and Finland. Greenwood Publishing Group, 2000.

External links

1925 films
1925 drama films
Swedish drama films
Swedish silent feature films
Swedish black-and-white films
Films directed by Gustaf Edgren
1920s Swedish-language films
Silent drama films
1920s Swedish films